Albania is the biggest producer of hydroelectric energy in the world by percentage (90% as of 2011) and by own production (100%). Albania aims to increase its hydroelectric energy production to 100%. Some of the projects underway include Skavica, which generates up to 350 MW, Devolli which generates up to 400 MW, Vjosa which generates up to 400 MW, Kalivaci and Ashta which both generate up to 48 MW, and Valbona and Tropojë, which both generate up to 40 MW.

See also

Renewable energy in Albania
Solar power in Albania

References